Assumption University (Thai: มหาวิทยาลัยอัสสัมชัญ, RTGS: Mahawitthayalai Assumption, abbreviated ABAC) also referred to by its acronym AU  is a private, Catholic, research higher education institution in Bangkok, Thailand administered by the Brothers of St. Gabriel.

History 

Assumption University originated from Assumption Commercial College in 1969 as an autonomous higher education institution under the name of Assumption School of Business. It adopted the name from the precedent school "Assumption College" given by Rev. Fr. Emile August Colombet, a French missionary in Siam, in 1885. 

Under the approval of the Ministry of Education in 1972, it was officially transformed into Assumption Business Administration College or ABAC and subsequently accredited by the Thai Ministry of University Affairs. Following the school's significant expansion to offer comprehensive programs in Bachelor's, Master's and Doctoral Degrees, in 1990, it was granted accordingly a new status as "Assumption University" by the Ministry of University Affairs.

Locations 
 Suvarnabhumi Campus
 Huamak Campus
 City Campus

Sedes Sapientiae: The Seat of Wisdom 

The university's Seat of Wisdom statue was blessed by Michael Cardinal Michai Kitbunchu on the 8th December 2000. A goldsmith was commissioned to craft a crown of pure gold for the statue of the Virgin Mary. On 15th August 2001 this gold crown was blessed by Bishop Lawrence Thienchai Samanchit.

Accreditation 
The University is accredited by OHEC (Office of Higher Education Commission), Thailand and ONESQA (Office for National Education Standards and Quality Assessment).

The University is also recognized by:
 The ASEAN Universities Network (AUN)
 The Association of Southeast Asian Institution of Higher Learning (ASAIHL)
 The Association of Christian Universities and Colleges in Asia (ACUCA)
 The Association of Southeast Asian Institution of Higher Learning (ASAIHL)
 The International Federation of Catholic Universities (IFCU)
 The U.S. Veterans Administration, Washington D.C.
 The United Nations Academic Impact (UNAI)

Institutions and research centers 
 ABAC Consumer Index
 ABAC Innovation, Creativity and Enterprise (ICE Center)
 ABAC Business Legal and Advisory Center
 ABAC SIMBA (ABAC Social Innovation in Management and Business Analysis)
 Confucius Institute
 ODI (Organization Development Institute)
 PAN AM International Flight Academy
 Tsinghua – ABAC AEC Research Institute
 Institute for Research and Academic Services (IRAS)

Notable alumni 

 Her Majesty, Queen Suthida Bajrasudhabimalalakshana, the Queen of Thailand
 Trinuch Thienthong, Minister of Education 
 Sukumol Kunplome, Former Minister of Culture
 Jennifer Harhigh, Deputy Chief of Mission at the U.S. Mission to the UN Agencies in Rome

References

External links 
 Assumption University Website
 Assumption University Campuses

 
Universities and colleges in Bangkok
Private universities and colleges in Thailand
Catholic universities and colleges
Brothers of Christian Instruction of St Gabriel
Association of Christian Universities and Colleges in Asia
Educational institutions established in 1969
1969 establishments in Thailand